A pebete is an Argentine and Uruguayan soft oval bun made of wheat flour with a thin brown crust, rather like a fatter hot dog roll. It is often used to make a sandwich, typically filled with cheese, cured meat, tomato and mayonnaise; the sandwich itself is usually called pebete followed by its filling, e.g., pebete de queso (cheese pebete).

According to the Royal Spanish Academy it is from the lunfardo term for young boy, itself from Catalan pevet.

See also
 List of buns
 List of sandwiches

References

Argentine cuisine
Sandwiches